Walzin Castle is a castle in the city of Dinant, Wallonia Belgium in the province Namur over the river Lesse, district of Dréhance. This Gothic Revival castle stands on a steep rock above the right bank of the Lesse, about 5km before it flows into the Meuse. Popular kayak routes allow a view of the castle from the Lesse valley.

History
At this strategic point in the Lesse, which used to be a ford, a hill castle was already noted in the 11th and 12th centuries. This eagle's nest was destroyed from the land up to four times. Only the 11th-century Keep has been preserved. The ruins of this military stronghold mainly consist of that keep with a remnant of about 13m of wall that is 1.70m to 3.30m thick. The first written notes of the Ruins of Cavrenne go back to 1235. In 1489, the then Prince-Bishopric of Liège ordered the destruction of the castle.

Construction and restoration
The castle has known different periods of decline and prosperity, and has therefore been renovated several times throughout history in different styles. Construction began in the 13th century, and the 15th-century Renaissance horseshoe tower with four cannon ports still exists, even though the castle was burned down by the French army in 1554.
In 1850, the later baron Alfred Brugmann bought the ruins and carried out many restorations. He had them restored in 1881 in a sort of Spanish-Flemish style by architect Émile Janlet. The castle in this version can be seen on many postcards and drawings from the Belle Époque.
In 1930, Baron Frédéric Brugmann de Walzin had the castle rebuilt again, this time by architect Octave Flanneau. He opted for the Maasland (Mosan art) style, which is common in the region, which gave the castle its current, well-known appearance. The works were finished in 1932.
The gardens of the castle were designed by architect Louis Julien Breydel, who also has the Botanical Garden in Brussels to his name. The castle is located in a wooded area, the Bois du Chaleux. Not accessible for viewing, however the gardens are. There is a guided walk every Thursday during the summer at 10am.
Victor Hugo made a drawing of it in 1863.

Gallery

See also
List of castles in Belgium

References

External links 
 

Castles in Belgium